V. Sampathkumar is an Indian politician and is Member of the Legislative Assembly of Tamil Nadu. He was elected to the Tamil Nadu legislative assembly as an All India Anna Dravida Munnetra Kazhagam candidate from Harur constituency in the by-election in 2019.

Electoral performance

References 

Living people
All India Anna Dravida Munnetra Kazhagam politicians
People from Dharmapuri district
Year of birth missing (living people)
Tamil Nadu MLAs 2021–2026